Stonelick may refer to:

Stonelick Covered Bridge, in Clermont County, Ohio
Stonelick State Park, in Clermont County, Ohio
Stonelick, Ohio, an unincorporated community
Stonelick Township, Clermont County, Ohio